Pate acha also called pete acha, tere, gote or gwete is a Nigerian dish from the northern part of Nigeria. It is made from ground corn, rice or acha.

See also

 Nigerian cuisine

References

Nigerian cuisine